Artificial Life is a peer-reviewed scientific journal that covers the study of man-made systems that exhibit the behavioral characteristics of natural living systems. Its articles cover system synthesis in software, hardware, and wetware. Artificial Life was established in 1993 and is the official journal of the International Society of Artificial Life. It is published online and in hard copy by the MIT Press.

Abstracting and indexing 
Artificial Life is abstracted and indexed in Academic Search, Biological Abstracts, BIOSIS Previews, CSA Mechanical & Transportation Engineering Abstracts, Compendex, Current Contents, EMBASE, Excerpta Medica, Inspec, MEDLINE, METADEX, PubMed, Referativny Zhurnal, Science Citation Index Expanded, Scopus, and The Zoological Record.

References

External links 
 
 International Society of Artificial Life

Computer science journals
MIT Press academic journals
Quarterly journals
Artificial life
English-language journals
Publications established in 1993
Academic journals associated with learned and professional societies